Qualeh Rash Vali (also Romanized as Qūaleh Rash Vālī) is a village in Dasht-e Hor Rural District, in the Central District of Salas-e Babajani County, Kermanshah Province, Iran. At the 2006 census, its population was 314, in 59 families.

References 

Populated places in Salas-e Babajani County